Guraleus himerodes is a species of sea snail, a marine gastropod mollusk in the family Mangeliidae.

Description
The length of the shell attains 6.5 mm, its diameter 2.5 mm.

(Original description) A pure white, extremely delicate little species, subvitreous, fusiform. It contains seven whorls, two of which are glassy and apical, the remainder being all very delicately ribbed, with spiral lirae, the interstices longitudinally striolate. At the sutures and the angle of the whorls there is a pale ochre band, again appearing, but almost obsoletely, in the middle of the body whorl. It is very conspicuous, however, just at the back of the outer lip. The aperture is narrow. The outer lip is thickened. The columella is simple.

Distribution
This marine species occurs in the central Pacific. The original specimen was found off Lifou Island.

References

External links
  Tucker, J.K. 2004 Catalog of recent and fossil turrids (Mollusca: Gastropoda). Zootaxa 682:1–1295.

himerodes
Gastropods described in 1896